The 1995 Japanese Formula 3000 Championship was scheduled over 9 rounds and contested over 8 rounds. 16 different teams, 26 different drivers, 3 different chassis and 3 different engines competed.

Calendar

Note:

The weekend in Fuji with the race cancelled on April, 9 saw only practice and qualification sections.

Race 6 stopped and restarted due to rain.

Final point standings

Driver

For every race points were awarded: 9 points to the winner, 6 for runnerup, 4 for third place, 3 for fourth place, 2 for fifth place and 1 for sixth place. No additional points were awarded. The best 6 results count.

Complete Overview

R13=retired, but classified R=retired NS=did not start

Formula Nippon
Super Formula